Mariano Natalio Carrera (born July 22, 1980) is an Argentine boxer, who represented his native country at the 2000 Summer Olympics.

Carrera began his pro career in 2001 and captured the WBA middleweight title by knocking out Javier Castillejo in 2006. Carrera tested positive for an illegal substance following the win over Castillejo, and the bout's result was officially overturned to a no-contest. His urine test was confirmed to have tested positive for the steroid Clenbuterol. He was stripped of the title. Carrera is not officially recognized as a former world champion by the WBA. Castillejo and Carrera met in a rematch in 2007 and Castillejo knocked out Carrera in six rounds. His height is 183 cm.

Professional boxing record 

|-
|align="center" colspan=8|32 Wins (23 KOs), 6 Losses, 0 Draw
|-
| align="center" style="border-style: none none solid solid; background: #e3e3e3"|Res.
| align="center" style="border-style: none none solid solid; background: #e3e3e3"|Record
| align="center" style="border-style: none none solid solid; background: #e3e3e3"|Opponent
| align="center" style="border-style: none none solid solid; background: #e3e3e3"|Type
| align="center" style="border-style: none none solid solid; background: #e3e3e3"|Round,Time
| align="center" style="border-style: none none solid solid; background: #e3e3e3"|Date
| align="center" style="border-style: none none solid solid; background: #e3e3e3"|Location
| align="center" style="border-style: none none solid solid; background: #e3e3e3"|Notes
|-align=center
|Loss
|32-6 
|align=left| Noe Gonzalez Alcoba
|
|
|
|align=left|
|
|-align=center
|Win
|32-5 
|align=left| Jose Hilton Dos Santos
|
|
|
|align=left|
|
|-align=center
|Loss
|31-5 
|align=left| Javier Castillejo
|
|
|
|align=left|
||

|-align=center
|Win
|31-4 
|align=left| Josival Lima Teixeira
|
|
|
|align=left|
||

|-align=center
|Win
|30-4 
|align=left| Oney Valdez
|
|
|
|align=left|
||

|-align=center
| style="background:#ddd;"|NC 
|29-4  
|align=left| Javier Castillejo
|
|
|
|align=left|
|align=left|

|-align=center
|Win
|29-4
|align=left| Luis Daniel Parada
|
|
|
|align=left|
||

|-align=center
|Win
|28-4
|align=left| Gustavo Javier Kapusi
|
|
|
|align=left|
||

|-align=center
|Win
|27-4
|align=left| Paulo Alejandro Sanchez
|
|
|
|align=left|
||

|-align=center
|Loss
|26-4
|align=left| Paulo Alejandro Sanchez
|
|
|
|align=left|
||

|-align=center
|Win
|26-3
|align=left| Ruben Eduardo Acosta
|
|
|
|align=left|
||

|-align=center
|Win
|25-3
|align=left| Luis Daniel Parada
|
|
|
|align=left|
||

|-align=center
|Win
|24-3
|align=left| Hugo Daniel Sclarandi
|
|
|
|align=left|
||

|-align=center
|Win
|23-3
|align=left| Gustavo Javier Kapusi
|
|
|
|align=left|
||

|-align=center
|Win
|22-3
|align=left| Jorge Sclarandi
|
|
|
|align=left|
||

|-align=center
|Win
|21-3
|align=left| Hector Javier Velazco
|
|
|
|align=left|
|align=left|

|-align=center
|Win
|20-3
|align=left| Juan Italo Meza
|
|
|
|align=left|
|align=left|

|-align=center
|Win
|19-3
|align=left| Enrique Campos
|
|
|
|align=left|
|align=left|

External links
 

1980 births
Living people
People from San Isidro, Buenos Aires
Middleweight boxers
Boxers at the 2000 Summer Olympics
Olympic boxers of Argentina
Doping cases in boxing
Argentine sportspeople in doping cases
Argentine male boxers
Sportspeople from Buenos Aires Province